Yasmine Akram (born 11 March 1981) is an Irish-Pakistani actress, writer and comedian. She has written comedy sketches for the BBC and Channel 4, and played Janine Hawkins in the third series of Sherlock.

Early life and education
Akram was born in Sharjah in the United Arab Emirates. Her family settled in Drogheda, Ireland when she was 18 months old. Her father is originally from Pakistan. Her mother Mona is from Drogheda and still lives in the town. She has a sister named Masooma.
 
From the age of 14, Akram collaborated with the Calipo Theatre and the Picture Company. She graduated from the Royal Academy of Dramatic Art where she studied acting.

Career
After graduating from drama school, Akram wrote comedy sketches for the BBC and Channel 4, and hosted for BBC Radio. She wrote her first play, 10 Dates with Mad Mary, a monologue about a young woman's struggles after leaving prison, and performed the play at Project Arts Centre in Ireland in 2010. This was adapted into the feature film A Date for Mad Mary in 2016.

She writes and performs as half of London-based comedy duo Ford and Akram with English comedian Louise Ford. The duo's live show in 2011 was directed by Alistair McGowan for the Edinburgh Festival Fringe. In 2013, she co-wrote and co-presented BBC Radio 4's Irish Micks and Legends with Aisling Bea, with whom she worked on the Channel 4 sketch comedy LOL.

In 2014, she portrayed Janine Hawkins opposite Benedict Cumberbatch's Sherlock Holmes in two episodes of the third series of Sherlock. She reprised the role in the 2016 special, "The Abominable Bride", in which her character's name was Janine Donlevy.

Filmography

Film

Television

Theatre

References

External links

1981 births
Living people
21st-century Irish actresses
21st-century Irish women writers
Actresses from County Louth
Alumni of RADA
Irish comedy writers
Irish people of Pakistani descent
Irish television actresses
Irish women comedians
People from Drogheda